Gundahoo River is a river in the Canadian boreal forest. It is located in the province of British Columbia, approximately 3,500 km west of the national capital, Ottawa, and about 1,200 km north of the provincial capital, Victoria. The area around the river is heavily pine forested and is almost uninhabited, with less than two inhabitants per square kilometre.

References

Rivers of British Columbia
Cassiar Land District